Manuel Benetti (born 27 January 1981) is an Italian former professional footballer who plays as a defender for Italian Serie D club Sarego.

Career

Early career
Benetti started his professional career at Vicenza Calcio. After he spent one season on loan at San Marino Calcio, he was signed by Monza in co-ownership deal. He played 50 games for Monza, but also suspended six times.

Sassuolo
Sassuolo signed Benetti and team-mates Marco Piccioni, Filippo Pensalfini from Monza in 2004, and Vicenza retained 50% registration rights of Benetti. Sassuolo also signed Fabrizio Anselmi, Nicolò Consolini, Sebastiano Girelli and Edevaldo Grimaldi, made the defensive line highly competitive. Anselmi, Consolini, Girelli, Grimaldi and Piccioni were the key player that the team promoted. In 2004–05 Serie C2, Benetti just played 22 times (18 starts), but also played once in the return leg of the promotion playoffs. He was substituted by Consolini (who also played in the first leg).

In June 2005 Vicenza gave up the remain 50% registration rights of Benetti. Benetti only made 13 starts (in 19 appearances) in 2005–06 Serie C2. He missed the first 12 round of the season. Benetti did not play any game in the playoffs. That season the team promoted as the playoffs winner. In 2006–07 Serie C1, Benetti made 18 starts (in 28 appearances). Coach Gian Marco Remondina used Benetti and Piccioni as centre-backs in the 2007 playoffs, losing to former club Monza. In his 3 seasons with Sassuolo, Benetti was suspended 4 times. (2004–05, once) (2005–06, twice, in rescheduled round 21 and round 27), (2006–07, once)

Treviso
In July 2007 he was signed by Serie B club Treviso. Half of the registration rights was subsequently sold to Serie C2 club Bassano, which also located in Veneto. However, he only played 8 times for Bassano. In January 2008, he was swapped with Mario Stancanelli of Sassuolo. However Benetti only played 8 more times for the Emilia club. Benetti also suspended once. (He collected 3 yellow cards with Sassuolo and once with Bassano.)  The team won 2007–08 Serie C1 group stage and promoted directly. Coach Massimiliano Allegri used Francesco Magnanelli and Consolini in Supercoppa di Lega di Prima Divisione, winning Salernitana to become the grand champion of the third division. In June 2008 Treviso bought back Benetti from Bassano. However, he did not have a shirt number and was released in June 2009 after the club bankrupted.

Serie D
Benetti was signed by Sarego of Eccellenza Veneto ca. 2010 (or 2009?). The team was located in the province of Vicenza. He followed the team promoted to 2011–12 Serie D.

Honours
Sassuolo
 Supercoppa di Lega di Prima Divisione: 2008
 Lega Pro Prima Divisione: 2007–08

References

External links
 Football.it Profile 

Italian footballers
L.R. Vicenza players
A.S.D. Victor San Marino players
A.C. Monza players
U.S. Sassuolo Calcio players
Bassano Virtus 55 S.T. players
Treviso F.B.C. 1993 players
Association football defenders
1981 births
Living people